NINA was a particle accelerator located at Daresbury Laboratory, UK that was used for particle physics and synchrotron radiation.

Introduction
Given government UK approval in 1962, NINA was a 70.19m, 4 GeV electron Synchrotron built in 1964 at the Daresbury Laboratory site in Cheshire, England to study particle physics. This was the first facility at this site and gave birth to the second national laboratory (after Rutherford Appleton Laboratory).

Along with other particle physics accelerators, scientists had been using the Synchrotron radiation produced by NINA for its unique properties. By 1975 over 50 scientists with affiliations to more than 16 institutions were at work on NINA exploiting this by product of the particle accelerator. This led to the conversion of the NINA ring into a dedicated source of synchrotron radiation at a cost of £3M at 1974 prices. The particle physics was to be exported to CERN, at the time a proposed 400 GeV machine.

Whilst the majority of NINA was reused onsite for the new SRS, some parts were repurposed at other facilities, including the 90 ton Choke which became a key part of the operation of the ISIS neutron source at the Rutherford Appleton Lab.

Specifications

Design Energy was 4 GeV and was reached in 1966
By the time NINA was closed it had been upgraded to 6GeV.
NINA contained 40 electro magnets
Initial acceleration was performed by a 40MeV linac in a tunnel outside the ring

References

Particle accelerators
Particle physics facilities
Particle experiments
Research institutes in Cheshire
Synchrotron radiation facilities